Khasab is a city and local capital of the Musandam Governorate which is an exclave of Oman bordering the United Arab Emirates at the tip of the Musandam Peninsula by the Strait of Hormuz. It has been dubbed the "Norway of Arabia" because of its extensive fjord-like craggy inlets and desolate mountainscapes.

Khasab is a small city when compared to nearby cities of the United Arab Emirates. It has many residents who mostly live in mainland Oman and come to Khasab for vacations. There is a huge population of Indians, Pakistanis and Bangladeshis, like in mainland Oman, who work in restaurants, grocery stores, supermarkets, tour operators and many other places.

The city is surrounded by the northern mountains of the Western Hajar Range. Khasab has a fully functional hospital and several hotels, beaches and parks across the city. The city's population is dominated by ethnic Omanis from the mainland. Khasab also has a fort which is known as Khasab Fort. The sea port is dominated by the dhows which take tourists for a cruise across the natural, dry "fjords".

The city is frequently visited by residents of UAE as the Khasab Coastal Road provides access to the city from UAE by connecting with the E11 Highway in the UAE side. The city can also be accessed by the ferry which is maintained by the Government. The ferries are modern.

History
The Portuguese built Khasab at the beginning of the 17th century, at the height of their naval presence in the region. The natural harbour gave shelter from rough seas. Unlike many forts, which were built on high ground for defensive purposes, Khasab was designed as a supply point for dates and water for Portuguese ships sailing through the strait. Today, Khasab is protected from floods by three large dams.

Economy

Access to the area by land was virtually impossible until a modern coast road was built, which allows fast access from the United Arab Emirates, making Khasab a popular weekend destination for people living in the Emirates. The new road also allows access to the village of Tawi, where prehistoric drawings of boats, animals and warriors can be seen in the rock face. Khasab also has a number of modern shopping areas with imported Irani goods and locally created pottery, and a few hotels, including the Khasab Hotel, Atana Musandam Resort and Atana Khasab Hotel, which sits on a cliff overlooking the Persian Gulf.

Khasab has an interesting trading position, which hinges on its proximity to Iran. Iranians export sheep and goats into the local port, from where the animals are dispatched to the United Arab Emirates and Saudi Arabia in trucks. On their return trip to the Islamic Republic, the sailors load their boats up with electronic goods and American cigarettes, arriving in Khasab after sunrise and leaving before sunset to conform with Omani immigration laws. Since the trading is illegal under Iranian law, they must avoid the Islamic Republic's coastguard as well as all other shipping in the busy waters of the Strait of Hormuz. The crossing is hazardous since the vessels, piled high either with livestock or with numerous boxes must avoid the path of the scores of oil-tankers which pass through the Strait in a transverse direction daily. Recent increases of United States' sanctions against Iran have increased the amount of smuggling done through Khasab.

Tourism

Boats from Khasab take tourists on trips to view the dolphins common in the waters around the Musandam, as well as to visit Telegraph Island, for a short time (between 1865 and 1868) the site of a staffed telegraph repeater station on the cable section between Bahrain and Bombay.

Scuba Diving
Scuba diving is relatively new in the region, most of the diving has based on the upper east coast of Musandam however a new operator to the area, Freestyle Divers, is researching sites closer to Khasab on the West side. Diving courses such as PADI open water course through to Dive Instructor courses are available at the dive Centre based at Atana Musandam in Khasab. The diving is variable regarding conditions, visibility and currents can be unpredictable so diving with local professionals is strongly advised. The underwater life can range from nudibranchs to black tip reef sharks, on a clear day many species of shoaling fish can be observed, cuttlefish, rays, in fact all species common to the Strait of Hormuz.

Climate
Khasab has a hot desert climate (Köppen climate classification BWh) with very hot and humid summers and mild winters. Precipitation is low, and mostly falls from December to March.

Gallery

See also

 Bukha
 Dibba Al-Bay'ah
 Madha
 Kumzar
 List of cities in Oman

References

External links
 Dolphins in Khasab, Musandam, Oman Tour (YouTube)
 Khasab Mussandam coastal road on motorcycles
 Dhow cruise and snorkeling in Khasab, Musandam peninsula, Oman

Populated places in Oman
Smuggling
Musandam Governorate
Ports and harbours of the Persian Gulf